The 1915 Auburn Tigers football team represented Auburn University in the 1915 Southern Intercollegiate Athletic Association football season. It was the Tigers' 24th season and they competed as a member of the Southern Intercollegiate Athletic Association (SIAA). The team was led by head coach Mike Donahue, in his 11th year, and played their home games at Drake Field in Auburn, Alabama. They finished with a record of six wins and two losses (6–2 overall, 5–1 in the SIAA).

Before the season
Baby Taylor was the only regular left at the start of the 1915 season.

Schedule

Season summary

Marion Military Institute
The season starts with a big  78–0 victory over Marion Military Institute.

Florida

Sources:

Auburn defeated Florida 7–0. Florida played hard for three quarters, until Wren scored the winning touchdown in the final period.

The starting lineup was Robinson (left end), Sample (left tackle), Taylor (left guard), Campbell (center), Fricks (right guard), Wynne (right tackle), Bonner (right end), Caughman (quarterback), Steed (left halfback), Prendergast (right halfback), Bidez (fullback).

Clemson
Clemson was defeated 14–0.

Mississippi A&M
Mississippi A&M lost 26–0.

Georgia
The Georgia Bulldogs fell to Auburn 12–0.

Mercer
Auburn beat Mercer 45–0, the season's sixth straight shutout.

Vanderbilt

Sources:

Vanderbilt coach Dan McGugin had been pointing to since before the season.  Auburn had dominated Southern football for the past two seasons, without a single team crossing its line.

Vanderbilt jumped out to a 17–0 lead on a rain-soaked field. A Curry pass to captain Russell Cohen opened the scoring. Cody personally took over from that point. In one of the greatest exhibitions of punt covering Cody smothered the receiver every time, recovering two fumbles, one across the goal line for a touchdown. Then, in the last ten seconds of play, Cody dropped kicked a three-pointer from the 33-yard line. Zerfoss and Friel punted splendidly. Curry's generalship was superb, and late in the game the Vandy line rose as one to throw back three Auburn charges on the five-yard line.

The starting lineup : Taylor (left end), Sample (left tackle), Ducote (left guard), Robinson (center), Frickey (right guard), Wynne (right tackle), Bonner (right end), Steed (quarterback), Wren (left halfback), Prendergast (right halfback), Bidez (fullback).

Georgia Tech

Georgia Tech closed what was then the greatest season in its history with a 7–0 defeat of Auburn. To begin the second quarter, Everett Strupper had two key plays, the last of which was the game-deciding touchdown. First he made 20 yards around with a pass from Morrison before being forced out of bounds. Next was the 19-yard touchdown. Strupper started around left end, then cut back into the center of the field, away from his blockers. He juked and eluded "every man on the Auburn team." On the last move Strupper faked right and then dove left underneath the outstretched arms of Baby Taylor into the endzone.

The starting lineup against Auburn: Taylor (left end), Wynne (left tackle), Campbell (left guard), Robinson (center), Frickey (right guard),  Sample (right tackle), Bonner (right end), Caughman (quarter), Ducote (left halfback), Prendergast (right halfback), Steed (fullback).

Postseason

Guard Baby Taylor was a unanimous All-Southern selection, and was selected third-team All-America by Walter Camp.

References

Bibliography
 

Auburn
Auburn Tigers football seasons
Auburn Tigers football